Larry Matthews (born 25 April 1969) competed for Canada in the men's standing volleyball event at the 2000 Summer Paralympics, where he won a silver medal. He also competed with the Canadian teams which won bronze medals in sitting volleyball at the 2011 Parapan American Games and 2015 Parapan American Games.

See also 
 Canada at the 2000 Summer Paralympics
 Canada at the 2011 Parapan American Games
 Canada at the 2015 Parapan American Games

References

External links 
 Larry Matthews at World ParaVolley

1969 births
Living people
Place of birth missing (living people)
Canadian men's volleyball players
Paralympic silver medalists for Canada
Paralympic medalists in volleyball
Volleyball players at the 2000 Summer Paralympics
Medalists at the 2000 Summer Paralympics
Medalists at the 2011 Parapan American Games
Medalists at the 2015 Parapan American Games
Paralympic volleyball players of Canada